Kalb Kandi may refer to:
 Kalb Kandi, Charuymaq
 Kalb Kandi, Hashtrud